The Land of Lost Content may refer to:

 The Land of Lost Content (book), a biography of schoolteacher Anthony Chenevix-Trench
 The Land of Lost Content (John Ireland), a song cycle
 Land of Lost Content (museum), a museum of popular culture in Shropshire, England

See also
 A Shropshire Lad by A. E. Housman, poem XL, the origin of the phrase